Elatsoe is a novel by Darcie Little Badger.

Critical reception and reviews 
Cole Rush of Tor.com gave 9/10 review to Elatsoe and wrote "I highly recommend picking up the book and relishing Darcie Little Badger’s exquisite tale". It has been reviewed by authors of NPR, School Library Journal, The Horn Book Magazine and Kirkus Reviews.

Awards 

American Indian Youth Literature Honor for Best Young Adult in 2022
Locus Award for Best First Novel in 2021
Time's Best 100 Fantasy Books of All Time
NPR's Best Book of 2020
Chicago Public Library's Best of the Best Books of 2020
Publishers Weekly Best Book of 2020
BuzzFeed's Best YA SFF Book of 2020
Shelf Awareness's Best Children's & Teen Books of 2020
Kirkus Best YA Book of 2020
Finalist for Lodestar Award for Best Young Adult Book in 2021
Finalist for Andre Norton Award in 2021
Whippoorwill Book Award in 2022

References 

2020 novels
Fiction books about the paranormal
2020 books